ABCD: Anybody Can Dance is a 2013 Indian Hindi-language dance drama film directed and choreographed by choreographer Remo D'Souza and produced by Ronnie Screwvala and Siddharth Roy Kapur under UTV Spotboy Motion Pictures. The film stars Prabhu Deva in lead role along with Ganesh Acharya and Kay Kay Menon. The participants of Dance India Dance appear in supporting roles. Along with the Tamil and Telugu dubbed versions titled Aadalam Boys Chinnatha Dance and ABCD respectively, the film, made at a budget of between Rs 120 million and 420  million, was released worldwide in 3D on 8 February 2013 to mostly positive reviews from critics.

A sequel, ABCD 2 was released on 19 June 2015.

Plot
 
After having a bitter disagreement with his friend and manager Jehangir Khan about the latter's blatant abuse of power and influence to win a dance competition called "Dance Dil Se" for his team JDC (Jehangir Dance Company), the choreographer of the dance company, Vishnu, quits his job. At first he wants to return home to Chennai, but his friend Gopi asks him to stay in Mumbai with him. Vishnu observes several young men using parkour to evade the police. They turn out to be proteges of Gopi, but despite their obvious raw talent, they lack the discipline required to become serious artists; they demonstrate this disastrously at a local event for a politician, wherein they set the stage on fire. After witnessing the youngsters showing their dancing abilities at Ganpati Chaturthi against their equally talented rival neighborhood, Vishnu decides to start his own dance group with them ultimately preparing them to compete in "Dance Dil Se". However, the lack of discipline among the dancers and rivalry between the two factions in the group led by D (Dharmesh Yelande) and Rocky (Salman Yusuff Khan) leads to multiple creative and emotional blocks. Initially, only Rocky and his gang are willing to attend the free classes, but soon D and his friends gravitate towards the studio.

They are soon joined by Chandu, a troubled but extraordinarily talented man suffering from a drug addiction, Shaina, a "bar dancer", and Rhea, a Westerner who was JDC's star dancer until Jehangir tried to sexually assault her during a "private instruction". Rhea immediately becomes the new star of the group. Though the students are initially skeptical of Shaina because of her profession, Chandu demonstrates a great deal of respect for Shaina and defends her in front of the class despite teasing from his peers. The pair quickly fall for one another, leaving quite a few of the boys heartbroken.

Despite repeated pleas for peace in the studio, the two main gangs continue to clash, driving Vishnu to his wit's end. However, the students seem to improve and as a reward, he gives them money to buy new speakers, but they nearly lose it all when Rhea takes them to an elite dance club where they challenge the resident champions, a professional dance crew called "Fictitious Crew". Vishnu arrives at the last minute and wins back the money, but while his students gain new respect for him he is furious with them. After some hard apologizing, he forgives them and they return to class with greater discipline and drive, only to suddenly be thrown out on the street after D's father calls the cops. During all of this Rocky and Rhea start to fall for each other whilst D burns with jealousy.

The crew head to Dance Dil Se and audition, but when Rocky and D fight onstage for Rhea, their chances of appearing on the show in the first place seems bleak. Jehangir, in a bid to humiliate Vishnu publicly, persuades the judges to take the "Dhongri Dance Revolution" crew on as the shows "jokers". Faced with ridicule and the idea that they are a joke and not true dancers, Vishnu asks Rocky and D to do a step that requires a great deal of trust from both, but they cannot muster the trust to manage it. Vishnu has them choose the people they would trust to perform the step with, but then tricks both dancers by blindfolding them and having them attempt it again; this time, they are successful. Vishnu then states that unless the two manage to do the step without blindfolds none of the dancers would be allowed to go home for the night. Several abortive and unsuccessful attempts later D and Rocky take a break and Chandu talks to D and tells him about Bhavana's secret love for D. Bhavana and D get together, D completes the move successfully with Rocky, and the two factions begin to trust each other and work together. They even perform a dance act full of comedy dressed as jokers to answer back Jehangir's comment. The community complains that their children should not be mixing in such a way and through an impromptu dance performance are the youth able to convince their families about the importance of their talent. However, D's conservative and orthodox father refused to accept that his son desires to be a dancer.

Before the semi-finals, Chandu prepares to propose to Shaina, but he meets his old drug dealer on the street. Now completely free from the hold of drugs he refuses to fall back into that world, but the dealer, irritated, tosses the ring intended for Shaina at him and it falls into the street. As he retrieves it, Chandu is hit by a truck and killed, leaving the team devastated. Shaina, though barely able to stand from grief, becomes the centrepiece of the team's semi-final routine, in which they express the loss of their friend, bringing audience members to tears. The team and the community come together to cremate Chandu, and DDR resolves to continue in the competition in Chandu's memory. At the finals, Jehangir pulls a dirty trick: his informant Mayur (a performer in DDR but, tempted by Jehangir's offer of a main lead role in JDC began to feed information to the opposition) leads JDC's dancers to copy DDR's choreography and performance concept. Faced with losing, DDR crafts a new routine on the spot, based around Lord Ganesha. Their heartfelt and spontaneous performance reminds the cold-hearted Jehangir of his old friendship with Vishnu and why they started JDC in the first place and he is humbled. The DDR crew are rewarded with thunderous applause and victory in the competition.

Cast

 Prabhu Deva as Vishnu
 Ganesh Acharya as Gopi 
 Kay Kay Menon as Jehangir Khan
 Salman Yusuff Khan as Rocky
 Dharmesh Yelande as Danish "D" Qureshi
 Lauren Gottlieb as Rhea
 Punit Pathak as Chandu
 Noorin Shah as Shaina
 Vrushali Chavan as Vrushali
 Bhavana Khanduja as Bhavana
 Paulson Thomas as Pauli
 Prince R Gupta as Biscuit
 Mayuresh Wadkar as Mayur
 Tushar Kalia as a dancer in JDC
 Rahul Shetty as Rahul
 Sushant Pujari as Sushi
 Milind Wagh as Afzal Qureshi, D's father
 Pankaj Tripathi as Vardha Bhai
 Mario Fernando Aguilera as Chris
 Saajan Singh
 Mohena Singh as Competitions dancer in the beginning of the film
 Kishore Aman Shetty
 Karishma Chavan
 Jayant Gadekar as Policeman
 Saroj Khan in "Psycho Re" (Special appearance)
 Remo D'Souza in "Psycho Re" (Special appearance)
 Manish Paul as host of Dance Dil Se (Special appearance)
 Prayas Choudhary as Ghungroo boys
 Sanjay Gurbaxani as Channel Head
 Sajjad Haqi as Sajjad

Release
The film was released on total of 750 screens which included 400 3D screens and 350 2D screens in India. The film's budget (cost of production) is estimated to be between Rs 120–420 million.

Reception
Lisa Tsering praised the film on The Hollywood Reporter as "exuberant, upbeat and overflowing with music". Prasanna D Zore for Rediff.com has given 4/5 stars and says ABCD Any Body Can Dance is a must watch not only for dance lovers but also for those who like good cinema. Taran Adarsh from bollywoodhungama rated the film ABCD 3/5 stars saying, "ABCD's biggest strength lies in the variety of dances that Remo presents to the spectators. On the whole, ABCD has some incredible, eye-popping dances as its soul. While the template may be conventional – the triumph of the underdog – the film has its share of moments that stay with you, especially the concluding portions of the film. Decent watch!" Shivesh Kumar of IndiaWeekly awarded the movie 3 out of 5 stars.

Critical reception
The soundtrack received highly positive reviews from critics. Shresht Poddar of Score Magazine gave the album 4 out of 5 stars saying, "Sachin-Jigar have delivered a multi-genre winning album. They have wonderfully demonstrated their versatility and deserve to be heard more. Despite having a couple of situational tracks, the album gets a thumbs up because of its uniqueness.". Giving the album 4 out of 5 stars, Rumnique Nannar of Bollyspice wrote, "ABCD is one of the best albums of 2013, simply because you can feel Sachin and Jigar in their element and creating lasting songs that complement the film’s core theme." Indibeats also gave it 4 out of 5 stars and commented, "ABCD is definitely out-of-the-box, crossing all expectations still delivering a package so brilliantly done. In a situation where we expected some hard hitting techno-rock tracks, Sachin-Jigar amazes us by the sheer choice of unconventional arrangements which mesmerizes in a great deal!" Bollywoodlife critic Suparna Thombare said, "With nine powerful tracks, ABCD is definitely Sachin-Jigar’s best work till date as their experiments have created some fresh new age sounds. But their success really lies in being able to balance western and Indian influences to create something that’s young, fresh and urban, yet Indian at its core. It would not be wrong to say that ABCD is India’s first step into the urban dance genre. Sachin-Jigar have arrived!". She also gave it 4 out of 5 stars. IBNLive gave it 3 out of 5 stars and noted, "The duo of Sachin-Jigar has delivered an album that has its moments. 'ABCD' is a versatile album though it falls short of creating an album with viral tracks."

Box office
ABCD had opening in India of Rs 45 million nett on the first day. It collected approximately Rs 195 million nett at the domestic box office in the first weekend. By the end of its first week, the film has grossed over 312 million nett. The film grossed $425,000 overseas in opening weekend.

Soundtrack

The film's music was done by the composer-duo Sachin–Jigar. All songs were written by Mayur Puri apart from Man Basiyo Saanwariyo which had lyrics by Priya Panchal.

Although the song "Sun Saathiya" was played as a scratch version in the film, it was reused in the sequel on popular demand and officially became part of its musical-themed soundtrack.

Track list

Sequel

The film spawned a sequel titled ABCD 2, which released on 19 June 2015.

References

External links
 

Indian dance films
2013 films
2013 3D films
Indian 3D films
UTV Motion Pictures films
UTV Software Communications franchises
2010s hip hop films
Films about dance competitions
Hindi-language drama films
Films directed by Remo D'Souza